The Manatus Map is a 1639 city map of New Amsterdam and other New Netherland settlements surrounding New York Harbor, with pictorial elements, and bearing the title  Manatus on the North River. Drafted during the period of Willem Kieft's directorship, its authorship is uncertain. Edward Van Winkle of the Holland Society of New York attributed it to the Dutch cartographer Johannes Vingboons, who made many manuscript maps for the West India Company. Isaac Newton Phelps Stokes did not exclude any of several candidates except for Andries Hudde, due to travel back to Europe for his marriage in that year.

The original drawing is lost and It survives only in two later 17th century copies made in the same studio with slight differences, as noted in Stokes' The Iconography of Manhattan Island. One of the copies came from the same collection as the Castello Plan at Villa di Castello, the other from a Henry Harrisse donation to the Library of Congress. The Harrisse copy is twenty-six and five-eighth inches by eighteen and one-fourth inches in size and shows Manhattan Island with Westchester and Bronx Counties on the North; a good part of Long Island on the East; the Bay, Sant Punt, and Hoogen Hoeck on the South; with Staten Island, Achter t' Col, Newark Bay, the Hackensack and Passaic Rivers, and Coney Island ("Conyni Eylant" in Harrisse or "Konyne Eylandt" in Castello) on the West. Sufficient of the surrounding country is shown to give a good idea of the comparative importance of the Island of Manhattan and its location with respect to the mainland. It also includes an inset with the names of early Manhattan settlers.

See also
Castello Plan
Cartography of New York City

References

External links

The Manatus Maps, The Iconography of Manhattan Island

1639 works
17th-century maps and globes
History of New York City
Maps of cities
Maps of New York City
New York (state) maps
New Netherland
New Jersey maps